The title of Earl of Gloucester was created several times in the Peerage of England.  A fictional earl is also a character in William Shakespeare's play King Lear.

Earls of Gloucester, 1st Creation (1121)
Robert, 1st Earl of Gloucester (1100–1147)
William Fitz Robert, 2nd Earl of Gloucester (1121–1183)
Isabel, 3rd Countess of Gloucester (d. 1217) held by husband after 1189, again by her in her own right from 1216 onward.
John of England (1166–1216), on becoming king in 1199 he granted the Earldom to Isabel's nephew
Amaury VI of Montfort-Évreux, (d. 1213), Earl of Gloucester
Geoffrey FitzGeoffrey de Mandeville, 2nd Earl of Essex, Earl of Gloucester, (d. 1216), married Isabel in 1214
Gilbert de Clare, 4th Earl of Hertford, 5th Earl of Gloucester (1180–1230), Isabel's nephew
Richard de Clare, 5th Earl of Hertford, 6th Earl of Gloucester (1222–1262)
Gilbert de Clare, 6th Earl of Hertford, 7th Earl of Gloucester (1243–1295)
Gilbert de Clare, 7th Earl of Hertford, 8th Earl of Gloucester (1291–1314)

Earls of Gloucester, 2nd Creation (1299)
Ralph de Monthermer, 1st Baron Monthermer (d. 1325). He acquired Earldoms through marriage to Joan of Acre, the widow of the 7th Earl, and lost them on her death in 1307 by reversion to the 8th Earl.

Earls of Gloucester, 3rd Creation (1337)
Hugh de Audley, 1st Earl of Gloucester (d. 1347)

Earls of Gloucester, 4th Creation (1397)
Thomas le Despencer, 1st Earl of Gloucester (1373–1400), degraded 1399

See also
 Duke of Gloucester
 Feudal barony of Gloucester

References

 
Forfeited earldoms in the Peerage of England
Noble titles created in 1093
Noble titles created in 1121
Noble titles created in 1299
Noble titles created in 1337
Noble titles created in 1397